Heribert Bruchhagen (born 4 September 1948 in Düsseldorf-Derendorf) is the new chairman of Hamburger SV since 2016.

From 1988 until 1992 he was general manager at FC Schalke 04. From 1992 until 1995 he worked in the same position for Hamburg and from 1998 until 2001 for Arminia Bielefeld. After that stint, Bruchhagen was CEO for competition at the Deutsche Fußball Liga.
Since 2003 he was sport director of Eintracht Frankfurt, working hard for the financial rehabilitation and stability of the club.

As an active player Heribert Bruchhagen played from 1968 until 1982 for DJK Gütersloh, which he subsequently managed from 1982 until 1988. After that he had a short managing stint with SC Verl, before moving to Schalke 04.

Bruchhagen is teacher for sports and geography and taught from 1977 until 1986 in Halle, Westphalia.

In August 2007, he was elected to the board of the Bundesliga execution.
Bruchhagen is widely known for his eloquent interviews, often criticizing the commercialisation in modern football and does not hesitate to counteract against ones like Bayern Munich chairman Karl-Heinz Rummenigge.

References

External links
 Heribert Bruchhagen at bundesliga.com
 Heribert Bruchhagen at eintracht-archiv.de
 

1948 births
Living people
Footballers from Düsseldorf
German footballers
German football managers
Eintracht Frankfurt presidents
German football chairmen and investors
FC Gütersloh 2000 players
2. Bundesliga players
FC Gütersloh 2000 managers
Association football forwards